Grand Traverse may refer to any of the following topics related to the state of Michigan, United States:

 Grand Traverse Band of Ottawa and Chippewa Indians, a Native American tribe
 Grand Traverse Bay, a bay of Lake Michigan in the Lower Peninsula
 Grand Traverse Bay Bottomland Preserve, a preservation area that encompasses the bay
 Grand Traverse College, a 19th-century college in Benzonia
 Grand Traverse County, Michigan
 Grand Traverse Light, a lighthouse on the Leelanau Peninsula, Lower Peninsula
 Grand Traverse Mall, an enclosed shopping mall in Traverse City
 Grand Traverse Regional Land Conservancy, a non-profit organization in Traverse City
 Grand Traverse Resort & Spa, a resort and meeting center in Acme
 Chateau Grand Traverse, a winery near Traverse City